Women's handball tournament at 31st SEA Games took place in Bac Ninh Sport University Indoor Stadium, Bac Ninh from 15 to 21 May 2022.

Follow the rule, third-place team wouldn't get the bronze medal.

Team participate

Result

All times at UTC+7

References

Handball at the 2021 Southeast Asian Games